Matn is the text of the hadith.

Matn or Metn may also refer to:

Books
 Matn Ibn Ashir, an Islamic fiqh book
 Matn ar-Risala, an Islamic fiqh book

Places
 Matn District, a Lebanese district
 Ras el-Matn, a Lebanese town